Spilletta (1749 – 1776) was a British Thoroughbred racehorse. She only raced once and is best known for being the dam of the undefeated Eclipse.

Background
Spilletta was a bay filly bred by the Sir Robert Eden and foaled in 1749. She was sired by the undefeated Regulus. Regulus was also a very successful stallion, becoming Champion sire eight times. Regulus also sired Careless and Cato. Spilletta's dam was Mother Western, a daughter of Smith's son of Snake.

Racing career
Spilletta only started one race, in April 1754 at Newmarket for a £50 Plate. She lost the race to Sir Charles Sedley's Royal, the Marquess of Hartington's Tantivy and Mr. Curzon's Jason.

Stud career
Spilletta was a broodmare at the Duke of Cumberland stud. She produced five foals:

 Ariaden – a bay filly foaled in 1759 and sire by Crab.
 Eclipse – a chestnut stallion foaled in 1764 and sired by Marske. He was undefeated during his 18 race career and is generally considered one of the best horses ever. His wins included 11 King's Plates, the Great Subscription Purse and a match against Bucephalus. He sired Planet, Pot-8-Os, King Fergus, Mercury, Young Eclipse, Saltram, Serjeant and Annette. Eclipse is the sire-line ancestor of most Thoroughbreds alive today.
 Proserpine – a bay mare foaled in 1766 and sired by Marske. She never raced, but was the dam of Humbug and six others.
 Garrick – first called Hyperion, a chestnut stallion foaled in 1772 and sired by Marske. He won a 140 guineas race at Newmarket in 1777. As a stallion he stood at Newmarket and near Malton in Yorkshire.
 Briseis – a chestnut filly foaled in 1774 and sired by Chrysolite.

Spilletta died in 1776.

Pedigree

Note: b. = Bay, br. = Brown

* Spilletta was inbred 3x4 to Snake. This means that the stallion appears one in the third generation and once in the fourth generation of her pedigree.

References

1749 racehorse births
1776 racehorse deaths
Racehorses bred in the Kingdom of Great Britain
Racehorses trained in the Kingdom of Great Britain
Thoroughbred family 12